Prozostrodontia is a clade of cynodonts including mammaliaforms and their closest relatives such as Tritheledontidae and Tritylodontidae. It was erected as a node-based taxon by Liu and Olsen (2010) and defined as the least inclusive clade containing Prozostrodon brasiliensis, Tritylodon langaevus, Pachygenelus monus, and Mus musculus (the house mouse). Prozostrodontia is diagnosed by several characters, including:
 Reduced prefrontal and postorbital bones, with the disappearance of a strut of bone called the postorbital bar separating the eye socket from the temporal region
 Unfused symphysis between the dentary bones in the lower jaw
 The presence of a small hole within the eye socket called the sphenopalatine foramen
 A long sagittal crest extending to the rearmost part of the lambdoidal crest at the back of the skull
 Neural spines of the dorsal vertebrae angled backward
 A convex-shaped iliac crest and a reduced posterior iliac spine on the hip
 An acetabular notch on the ischium (a groove in the hip socket)
 The position of a small projection called the lesser trochanter close to the head of the femur

Prozostrodontia includes tritylodontids, which have traditionally been placed within the more primitive cynodont group Cynognathia as distant mammal relatives. It also includes Tritheledontidae, which has long been placed close to mammals. Most previous studies considered Tritheledontidae a valid monophyletic grouping, meaning it was a true clade including all the descendants of a single common ancestor, but Liu and Olsen (2010) found Tritheledontidae to be a paraphyletic series of basal prozostrodontians. Below is a cladogram from Liu and Olsen (2010) showing the phylogenetic position of Prozostrodontia:

References

 
Carnian first appearances
Extant Late Triassic first appearances